Galena is a ghost town in Snohomish County, Washington.

References

 

Unincorporated communities in Snohomish County, Washington
Unincorporated communities in Washington (state)
Ghost towns in Washington (state)